Simferopol-Passazirsky is a railway station in Simferopol, Crimea, a territory recognized by a majority of countries as part of Ukraine, but de facto under occupation of Russia. The station building, designed by the famous Soviet architect Alexey Dushkin in 1951 and renovated in 2000, is one of the main architectural attractions of Simferopol.

History

Russian Empire
The lack of a railway in Crimea greatly complicated the Crimean War. After the war, it hampered trade and the development of the economy of Crimea and neighbouring regions.

In the summer of 1871, construction began on the 615-kilometre Lozova–Sevastopol railway. Low-paid jobs in the severe conditions of winter and summer provoked a struggle for basic rights. Some workers went on strike; the largest strike occurred in May 1873 on the Simferopol–Sevastopol segment of the railway.

Construction near Simferopol started in 1872. The original route for the Lozova–Sevastopol railway would have passed about 32 kilometres west of Simferopol. But industrialists and merchants there, aware of the benefits a railway would bring to the city, pushed successfully for the route to be revised. Officials and landowners in Simferopol provided free land for the station and locomotive depot.

The first section of the railway — Lozova–Aleksandrovsk, with a branch in Ekaterinoslav — was commissioned on 15 November 1873. The second, Aleksandrovsk–Melitopol, opened on 23 July 1874. On 1 June 1874, the first freight train arrived at the Simferopol station. And on 14 October 1874, the 367-kilometre Melitopol–Simferopol segment opened, and the first passenger train arrived at the station. The 116-kilometre Simferopol–Sevastopol segment was built in 1875. On 5 January, the full Lozova–Simferopol line began operations.

In 1909, freight trains brought almost 11 million pounds of cargo to Simferopol. The development of industry in Crimea demanded the import of oil, coal, iron, steel, sheet metal, rail, scaffolding, and stone. Exports from Crimea consisted mainly of agricultural products: fruits, vegetables, tobacco, wine, and lime.

Occupation by the Nazis
From 1916 to 1944, the Simferopol station was operated by a group of Soviet soldiers under the leadership of Viktor Kirillovich Yefremov. Before the Great Patriotic War, Yefremov was deputy head of the station. During the war, Nazi occupiers killed his wife. He was offered a job with the Third Reich and then the position of "Russian chief of station".

Instead, Yefremov organized a clandestine group of station workers. They committed 17 acts of sabotage, including blowing up nine trains carrying ammunition and two carrying fuel. Under various pretexts, they delayed the repair of rolling stock, contaminated equipment, and passed on intelligence on the quantity and movement of goods, equipment, and troops.

In early March 1944, the Nazis arrested Yefremov and other members of his team. One member, A. A. Breyer, not wanting to surrender to the Nazis, threw himself under a train.

In 1972, a memorial plaque was installed at the station with bas-reliefs of Yefremov and his band: Breyer, V. Lavrinenko, I. Levitsky, and N. Y. Sokolov. The monument was made by sculptors V. V. Petrenko and N. I. Petrenko.

Ukraine
In 1991, the station was part of Cisdnieper Railways a subdivision of Ukrainian Railways. Long-distance trains provide connections to every major Ukrainian city of Kyiv, Donetsk, Lugansk, Sumy, Kharkiv, Lviv, Dnepropetrovsk, Khmelnytskyi, Kremenchuk, Kryvyi Rih and Odesa. They also have international connections with Russia, and Belarus.

Under "de facto" control by  Russian Federation
On 18 March 2014, after Russia annexed Crimea, Ukrainian authorities stopped all the rail connections to Mainland Ukraine, and as the result, fewer trains served the Simferopol station. The station became operated by Crimea Railway as part of the Russian government.  On 25 December 2019, the passenger train to Moscow was resumed following the opening ceremony of Crimean Bridge. However, Cisdnieper Railway still claims to be part of it.

Destinations

Major destinations

Inter-connection to Mainland Russia

Gallery

References

Buildings and structures in Simferopol
Railway stations in Crimea
Railway stations in the Russian Empire opened in 1874
Cultural heritage monuments of regional significance in Crimea